T&M USA is an American private security, intelligence and investigations company headquartered in New York City, New York.

T&M is a security, cyber, intelligence and investigative firm with a broad spectrum of risk mitigation and management offerings directed at banks, hedge funds and other financial service firms as well as law firms, academic institutions, Fortune 500 businesses and private clients. T&M provides executive protection, security consulting services, investigations and sexual misconduct consulting and investigations. 

All T&M services are supported by the T&M Command Center, a 24/7 emergency operations center and security concierge that monitors and reports on worldwide safety and security-related events, provides situational awareness alerts, and coordinates response efforts in the event of a client crisis or need.

History

Founding 
T&M was founded in 1981 as T&M Protection Services by Robert Trotta and John Molloy, both former NYPD detectives. T&M was one of the first security firms in New York City to utilize the services of off-duty police officers.

Reorganization
In 1999, T&M Protection Services was reorganized by current chairman and CEO Robert S. Tucker. Since then, Tucker has led the expansion of the company’s offerings, hiring experts who are former prosecutors and lawyers; previous members of federal, state and local law enforcement; and private sector security and intelligence experts to head each distinct unit.

Restructuring and Investment by Pegasus
In 2007, T&M restructured itself as a limited liability company and sold a minority interest to Pegasus Capital Advisors and another private investor.

Creation of T&M Israel
In 2008, T&M and Pegasus commenced a plan to invest jointly in acquisitions of security companies in Israel. This resulted in the creation of T&M Protection Resources Holdings Israel Ltd, becoming the largest security and cleaning service company in the country with over 14,000 employees.

Sales to Universal Protection and MSA Security
In 2012, T&M divested its U.S. security guard service business to Universal Protective Services and divested its Explosive Detection Canine operation to MSA Security.

Federal Trade Commission settlement
In 2020, the Federal Trade Commission voted 5-0 to finalize a settlement over allegations that T&M misrepresented its participation in and compliance with the EU–US Privacy Shield framework.

Notable Current Employees
 Robert S. Tucker – Chairman and CEO – former special assistant to the district attorney of Queens County; former chairman of the New York State Security Guard Advisory Council; member of the Committee on Character and Fitness for the Ninth Judicial District of New York; Secretary of the FDNY Foundation; honorary fire commissioner of the City of New York; member of the Board of Trustees of the New York City Police Foundation; honorary police commissioner of the City of New York; Police Board Commissioner of Westchester County, New York; Deputy Sheriff in the Public Safety Emergency Force of Westchester County, New York and member of the Board of Directors and Past President of ALDONYS (Associated Licensed Detectives of New York State). 
 Robert H. Silbering – Special Advisor to the Chairman – former special narcotics prosecutor for the City of New York 
 Joseph M. Russo – Senior Vice President of Executive Protection – former special agent in charge of the U.S. Secret Service Clinton Protective Division 
 Michael J. Mansfield, J.D. - Senior Vice President of Investigations - former commissioner and chair of the New York City Business Integrity Commission.

References

Business services companies established in 1981
Companies based in New York City
Security companies of the United States